Hopang Township is a township of the Wa Self-Administered Division in the Shan State of Burma. The principal town is Hopang. It is one of the 6 townships of Wa Self-Administered Division. It became part of Hopang District instead of Kunlong District in 2011.

The 3 main routes which link Hopang and other parts are 804 mile long Hopang-Lashio-Mandalay-Taunggyi-Mongpyin-Matman Road, the 343 mile long Hopang-Lashio-Tangyan-Panghsan-Matman Road and the 257 mile long Hopang-Mongmao-Panghsan-Matman Road.

Its total population before 1995 was 70,720 and Wa nationals were 24,024.

There are 3,713 acres of rubber plantation in 2007.

References

Townships of Shan State